Argentina is a federal republic in the southern half of South America. Sharing the bulk of the Southern Cone with its neighbor Chile to the west, the country is also bordered by Bolivia and Paraguay to the north, Brazil to the northeast, Uruguay and the South Atlantic Ocean to the east, and the Drake Passage to the south.

Benefiting from rich natural resources, a highly literate population, a diversified industrial base, and an export-oriented agricultural sector, the economy of Argentina is Latin America's third-largest, and the second largest in South America. It has a "very high" rating on the Human Development Index and a relatively high GDP per capita, with a considerable internal market size and a growing share of the high-tech sector.

For further information on the types of business entities in this country and their abbreviations, see "Business entities in Argentina".

Notable firms 
This list includes notable companies with primary headquarters located in the country. The industry and sector follow the Industry Classification Benchmark taxonomy. Organizations which have ceased operations are included and noted as defunct.

References 

Argentina